Mother: A Cradle to Hold Me is a 2006 collection of poems by Maya Angelou, praising mothers. The book entered The New York Times Best Seller list the week of May 21, 2006 at number thirteen.

References

2006 books
Books by Maya Angelou
Poetry by Maya Angelou